Antti Palojärvi (born 18 January 1999) is a Finnish professional ice hockey defenceman who is currently playing for  KooKoo of the Liiga.

Playing career
He was selected by the Pittsburgh Penguins in the sixth round, 186th overall, of the 2017 NHL Entry Draft.

Palojärvi made his Liiga debut with Lukko during the 2018–19 season. He appeared in 16 games at the top level, recording 2 assists, before he was loaned for the remainder of the season to second-tier club, SaPKo of the Mestis, on 28 January 2019.

On 9 June 2020, Palojärvi left Lukko, signing an optional two-year contract with his original youth club, KooKoo of the Liiga.

Career statistics

References

External links

1999 births
Living people
Finnish ice hockey defencemen
Hokki players
Kokkolan Hermes players
Lukko players
People from Kouvola
Pittsburgh Penguins draft picks
SaPKo players
Sportspeople from Kymenlaakso